Jeffrey L. George (born December 24, 1957) is a former American football defensive back who played two games for the Tampa Bay Buccaneers in the 1987 National Football League season. He played college football at Illinois State University. He also played in the Canadian Football League (CFL) for the Montreal Concordes and Edmonton Eskimos, and the United States Football League (USFL) for the Tampa Bay Bandits and Orlando Renegades. He was selected to the 1983 USFL All-Star team.

References 

1957 births
Living people
People from Atchison, Kansas
Players of American football from Kansas
American football defensive backs
Illinois State Redbirds football players
Montreal Concordes players
Tampa Bay Bandits players
Edmonton Elks players
Tampa Bay Buccaneers players